Giant Bones '80 is an album by trombonists Kai Winding and Curtis Fuller which was recorded in Denmark in 1979 and released on the Swedish Sonet label.

Reception

Allmusic awarded the album 4 stars noting "After a successful partnership with J.J. Johnson during the 1950s (with a few more meetings in the 1960s), it's not surprising that Kai Winding enjoyed hooking up with another trombonist from time to time. This meeting with Curtis Fuller, made for Sonet in 1979, rekindles the magic Winding experienced with Johnson, even with different material and musicians ... well worth acquiring".

Track listing 
All compositions by Kai Winding except where noted
 "Love 4 Rent" – 6:47
 "Sweetness" (Curtis Fuller) – 3:52
 "I Fall in Love Too Easily" (Jule Styne, Sammy Cahn) – 4:37
 "Scrapple from the Apple" (Charlie Parker) – 4:15
 "Corriente" – 4:36
 "Nu Groove" (Fuller) – 4:35
 "Never Never Land" (Styne, Betty Comden, Adolph Green) – 5:45
 "Hola" – 3:22

Personnel 
Kai Winding, Curtis Fuller – trombone
Horace Parlan – piano 
Mads Vinding – bass
Ed Thigpen – drums

References 

Kai Winding albums
Curtis Fuller albums
1980 albums
Sonet Records albums